Serene Ross (born October 15, 1977) is an American former track and field athlete who competed in the javelin throw.

Ross was both United States champion and NCAA champion in the javelin in 2002. She represented her country twice internationally: at the Summer Universiade in 2001 and the IAAF World Cup in 2002.

Career
Born in Edinburg, Pennsylvania, she attended Wilmington Area High School before going on to study sociology at Purdue University between 1997 and 2002. While at college she competed in NCAA competition for the Purdue Boilermakers team, with her first major placing being seventh in the javelin throw at the 1999 NCAA Outdoor Championships.

Ross threw at national level at the 2000 United States Olympic Trials, placing 19th in qualifying. Collegiately, she competed in both javelin and hammer throw events that year. At the NCAA Championships she was 13th in javelin and 18th in hammer. She claimed her first regional title in the hammer throw at the Big Ten Conference championships. Ross moved up the national javelin rankings with a sixth-place finish at the 2001 NCAA Championships, then third place at the 2001 USA Outdoor Track and Field Championships. The latter performance earned her the chance to represent the United States at the 2001 World Championships in Athletics, but she did not achieve the qualifying standard within the time period. She ranked fourth in the United States that year.

The 2002 season marked the high point of her career. She started the year in the weight throw, taking 15th place at the NCAA Indoor Championships. This made her only the second Purdue female athlete to win an NCAA title (after Corissa Yasen's 1996 heptathlon win). That record lasted only one month as Kim Kreiner (the runner-up at the national event) threw  that July. Ross was selected for the 2002 IAAF World Cup team and duly finished fifth at the event.

Ross gained a professional sponsorship deal with Nike, Inc. but did not compete at a high level in 2003. She did not compete at a high level after the 2004 season. As she had not formally retired, she was still under USA Track & Field rules and subsequently failed a doping test in 2006 for two banned diuretics (hydrochlorothiazide and triamterene). She was banned for two years from the sport, although she had not been competing during that period regardless.

After retiring from competition, she went into coaching and became a volunteer assistant coach at her alma mater.

National titles
USA Outdoor Track and Field Championships
Javelin throw: 2002
NCAA Women's Division I Outdoor Track and Field Championships
Javelin throw: 2002

International competitions

See also
List of doping cases in athletics

References

External links

Living people
1977 births
American female javelin throwers
American sportspeople in doping cases
Purdue Boilermakers women's track and field athletes
Doping cases in athletics
People from Lawrence County, Pennsylvania
Sportspeople from Pennsylvania